A sidereal year, also called a sidereal orbital period, is the time that Earth or another planetary body takes to orbit the Sun once with respect to the fixed stars.

Hence, for Earth, it is also the time taken for the Sun to return to the same position relative to Earth with respect to the fixed stars after apparently travelling once around the ecliptic.

It equals  for the J2000.0 epoch. The sidereal year differs from the solar year, "the period of time required for the ecliptic longitude of the Sun to increase 360 degrees", due to the precession of the equinoxes.
The sidereal year is 20 min 24.5 s longer than the mean tropical year at J2000.0 .

At present, the rate of axial precession corresponds to a period of 25,772 years, so sidereal year is longer than tropical year by 1,224.5 seconds (20 min 24.5 s, ~365.24219*86400/25772).

Before the discovery of the precession of the equinoxes by Hipparchus in the Hellenistic period, the difference between 
sidereal and tropical year was unknown. For naked-eye observation, the shift of the constellations 
relative to the equinoxes only becomes apparent over centuries or "ages", and pre-modern calendars such as 
Hesiod's Works and Days would give the times of the year for sowing, harvest, and so on by reference to the first visibility 
of stars, effectively using the sidereal year. The Indian national calendar, based on the works of 
Maga Brahmins, as are the calendars of neighbouring countries, is traditionally reckoned by the Sun's entry into the sign of 
Aries and is also supposed to align with the spring equinox and have relevance to the harvesting and planting 
season and thus the tropical year. However, as the entry into the constellation occurs 25 days later, 
according to the astronomical calculation of the sidereal year, this date marks the  South and Southeast Asian solar New Year in 
other countries and cultures.

See also 

 Anomalistic year
 Gaussian year
 Julian year (astronomy)
 Orbital period
 Precession § Astronomy
 Sidereal time
 Solar calendar
 Tropical year
Mars time

Notes

Works cited 

Astronomical coordinate systems
Types of year
Hindu astrology
Technical factors of astrology

ru:Сидерический год